Chuak is the traditional Tripuri rice-beer, popular in Northeast India. It is made by fermenting rice in water.  It is usually drunk on social occasions of any Tripuri ceremony as a ritual. Chuak is offered to village elders on any occasion or celebration in a traditional Tripuri family.

References

Tripuri cuisine
Indian drinks
Types of beer